The 1988 NCAA Division II Men's Soccer Championship was the 17th annual tournament held by the NCAA to determine the top men's Division II college soccer program in the United States.

Florida Tech defeated Cal State Northridge in the final, 3–2, to win their first Division II national title. The Panthers (15-6) were coached by Rick Stottler.

The final match was played on December 4 in Northridge, California.

Bracket

Final

See also  
 NCAA Division I Men's Soccer Championship
 NCAA Division III Men's Soccer Championship
 NAIA Men's Soccer Championship

References 

NCAA Division II Men's Soccer Championship
NCAA Division II Men's Soccer Championship
NCAA Division II Men's Soccer Championship
NCAA Division II Men's Soccer Championship